The 2018 Castrol Toyota Racing Series was the fourteenth running of the Toyota Racing Series, the premier open-wheel motorsport category held in New Zealand. The series consisted of fifteen races at five meetings. It began on 13 January at Ruapuna Park in Christchurch, and concluded on 11 February with the 63rd running of the New Zealand Grand Prix, at Circuit Chris Amon in Feilding. 

M2 Competition driver Robert Shwartzman won the title, being the only driver who finished in the top-five every race of the season. His teammates (and series returnees) Richard Verschoor and Marcus Armstrong had more podium finishes and race wins, but were not as consistent as Shwartzman. Another M2 driver Juan Manuel Correa raced his first season in the series, but was not considered as a rookie due to his GP3 Series experience, and he won races at Teretonga and Taupo; he finished fourth in the standings. Giles Motorsport driver Clément Novalak was the highest placed rookie who conformed series regulations, winning races at Teretonga and Hampton Downs and completed the top-five in the championship.

Teams and drivers

Race calendar and results
The calendar for the series was announced on 22 June 2017, and was held over five successive weekends in January and February.

Championship standings
In order for a driver to score championship points, they have to complete at least 75% of the race winner's distance, and be running at the race's completion. All races counted towards the final championship standings.

Scoring system

Drivers' championship

Footnotes

References

External links
 

Toyota Racing Series
Toyota Racing Series